Raven Klaasen and Rajeev Ram were the defending champions, but Ram chose not to participate and Klaasen chose to compete in Marseille instead.

Jack Sock and Jackson Withrow won the title, defeating Nicholas Monroe and John-Patrick Smith in the final, 4–6, 6–4, [10–8].

Seeds

Draw

Draw

External links
 Main draw

Delray Beach Open - Doubles
2018 Doubles